Buffalo is a city in Wilson County, Kansas, United States.  As of the 2020 census, the population of the city was 217.

History
Buffalo was founded in 1867. It took its name from Buffalo Creek, which was named after the American bison, commonly known as the buffalo.

The first store in Buffalo opened in 1869 and the first hotel in 1870. Buffalo experienced growth in 1886 when the Missouri Pacific Railroad was built through it. Buffalo was incorporated as a city in 1898.

Geography
Buffalo is located at  (37.709569, -95.696967).

Demographics

2010 census
As of the census of 2010, there were 232 people, 95 households, and 70 families residing in the city. The racial makeup of the city was 97.8% White, 0.9% Native American, and 1.3% from two or more races. Hispanic or Latino of any race were 0.9% of the population.

There were 95 households, of which 35.8% had children under the age of 18 living with them, 56.8% were married couples living together, 11.6% had a female householder with no husband present, 5.3% had a male householder with no wife present, and 26.3% were non-families. 23.2% of all households were made up of individuals, and 7.4% had someone living alone who was 65 years of age or older. The average household size was 2.44 and the average family size was 2.79.

The median age in the city was 40 years. 26.7% of residents were under the age of 18; 6.5% were between the ages of 18 and 24; 24.1% were from 25 to 44; 28.4% were from 45 to 64; and 14.2% were 65 years of age or older. The gender makeup of the city was 50.4% male and 49.6% female.

2000 census
As of the census of 2000, there were 284 people, 107 households, and 78 families residing in the city. The racial makeup of the city was 96.83% White, 0.35% African American, 1.76% Native American, and 1.06% from two or more races. Hispanic or Latino of any race were 0.70% of the population.

There were 107 households, out of which 35.5% had children under the age of 18 living with them, 59.8% were married couples living together, 8.4% had a female householder with no husband present, and 27.1% were non-families. 25.2% of all households were made up of individuals, and 14.0% had someone living alone who was 65 years of age or older. The average household size was 2.65 and the average family size was 3.09.

In the city, the population was spread out, with 31.3% under the age of 18, 6.3% from 18 to 24, 26.8% from 25 to 44, 22.5% from 45 to 64, and 13.0% who were 65 years of age or older. The median age was 34 years. For every 100 females, there were 83.2 males. For every 100 females age 18 and over, there were 85.7 males.

The median income for a household in the city was $34,688, and the median income for a family was $38,750. Males had a median income of $26,750 versus $15,938 for females. The per capita income for the city was $13,529. About 6.7% of families and 7.0% of the population were below the poverty line, including 12.3% of those under the age of eighteen and 5.7% of those 65 or over.

Government
City Hall is located at 212 W Buffalo Street.

Education
The community is served by Altoona-Midway USD 387 public school district. The Altoona-Midway High School mascot is Jets.

Buffalo High School closed in 1958 through school unification. The Buffalo High School mascot was Pirates.

Notable people
 Milburn Apt (1924–1956),  U.S. Air Force test pilot, first man to attain speeds faster than Mach 3
 Claude Willoughby (1898–1973), professional baseball pitcher from -. He played for the Philadelphia Phillies and Pittsburgh Pirates.

See also
 38th parallel structures

References

Further reading

External links
 Buffalo - Directory of Public Officials
 USD 387, local school district
 Buffalo city map, KDOT

Cities in Kansas
Cities in Wilson County, Kansas
1867 establishments in Kansas
Populated places established in 1867